The San Bernardino National Forest is a United States National Forest in Southern California encompassing  of which  are federal.  The forest is made up of two main divisions, the eastern portion of the San Gabriel Mountains and the San Bernardino Mountains on the easternmost of the Transverse Ranges, and the San Jacinto and Santa Rosa Mountains on the northernmost of the Peninsular Ranges. Elevations range from 2,000 to 11,499 feet (600 to 3505 m).  The forest includes seven wilderness areas: San Gorgonio, Cucamonga, San Jacinto, South Fork, Santa Rosa, Cahuilla Mountain and Bighorn Mountain. Forest headquarters are located in the city of San Bernardino. There are district offices in Lytle Creek, Idyllwild, and Fawnskin.

This site was the filming location for Daniel Boone in 1936; part of the 1969 musical film Paint Your Wagon was shot here.

Free camping is available at 47 different 'Yellow Post' campsites located throughout the forest.

Geography
According to United States Geological Survey maps of the forest, it consists of two large areas or tracts: a northern and southern portion.

The west border of the forest adjoins Angeles National Forest and runs north-south about ten miles west of Interstate 15. This portion of the forest encompasses the San Bernardino Mountains. The area extends west of Mount San Antonio and Wrightwood in San Bernardino County. The eastern portion of the forest extends about ten miles east of Big Bear City and includes the San Gorgonio Wilderness. The  southernmost portion is bisected by the Riverside County line and borders the Morongo Indian Reservation north of Cabazon.

Toro Peak and the Santa Rosa Indian Reservation are near the south extent. At the north is Snow Creek Village and the Morongo Indian Reservation. Mount San Jacinto State Wilderness is carved out of the southern portion. The community of Idyllwild is surrounded by national forest lands.

While most National Forests include lumber resources, these two areas also include:
 Residential communities and resorts
 Indian resources such as historically important caves and pictographs
 The University of California-owned James Reserve research station

The two tallest waterfalls in Southern California, Big Falls and Bonita Falls, are located in the San Bernardino National Forest.

Wilderness areas
There are seven official wilderness areas lying within San Bernardino National Forest that are part of the National Wilderness Preservation System. One extends into neighboring Angeles National Forest and three into land that is managed by the Bureau of Land Management (as indicated).
 Bighorn Mountain Wilderness (mostly BLM)
 Cahuilla Mountain Wilderness
 Cucamonga Wilderness (partly in Angeles NF)
 San Gorgonio Wilderness (partly BLM)
 San Jacinto Wilderness
 Santa Rosa Wilderness (mostly BLM)
 South Fork San Jacinto Wilderness

Esperanza Fire
 The five-member crew (Mark Loutzenhiser, Jess McLean, Jason McKay, Daniel Hoover-Najera and Pablo Cerda) of the San Bernardino National Forest Alandale Fire Station's Engine 57 was fatally burned by a sudden, intense fire run up a steep drainage below their location during the Esperanza Fire at approximately 7:15 a.m. on October 26, 2006.  All five firefighters were overrun by the fire at Twin Pines, located in the San Jacinto Mountains approximately four miles southwest of the City of Cabazon, California.  The fire was located near Beaumont, California in Riverside County.  Alandale station is located near the community of Idyllwild.

Firefighting aircraft operations
As of 2001, eight Air Tactical Group Supervisors (ATGSs) work out of the Forest Supervisor's Office in San Bernardino. This position requires completion of an 80-hour CDF/Forest Service attack management course. A Helicopter Coordinator (J-374) course is recommended.

Vegetation
There are many different species of trees, many coniferous, that grow in the mountains. Pines, such as ponderosa pine, Jeffrey pine, sugar pine, Coulter pine, lodgepole pine, single-leaf pinyon, and knobcone pine all thrive here. Other coniferous trees, such as white fir, bigcone Douglas-fir (Pseudotsuga macrocarpa), incense cedar, and western juniper also thrive here. Canyon live oak, California black oak, and Pacific dogwood are other trees that also grow here. The forest contains an estimated  of old growth.  The most common old-growth forest types are Sierra Nevada mixed conifer forests, white fir (Abies concolor) forests, Jeffrey pine (Pinus jeffreyi) forests, and lodgepole pine (Pinus contorta) forests.

Climbing 
Gavin Escobar, a former Dallas Cowboys player, and a girl died around noon on September 28, 2022, while rock climbing near Tahquitz Rock.

See also
Big Bear Lake
Deep Creek Hot Springs
Big Bear Discovery Center
Fires in San Bernardino National Forest
Valley Fire
Cranston Fire

References

Yellow Post Camp Site Info Dated Feb 2014  https://commons.wikimedia.org/wiki/File:Yellow_camp_site_info_big_bear.pdf

External links

Official San Bernardino National Forest website
Local Hikes.com: Southern California Trails in the San Bernardino National Forest 
Off-Road Trails in the San Bernardino National Forest
SBNF Supervisor's webpage (2006)

 
National Forests of California
.
San Jacinto Mountains
Protected areas of Riverside County, California
Protected areas of San Bernardino County, California
Parks in Southern California
Protected areas established in 1907
1907 establishments in California
Protected areas of Southern California
Tourist attractions in San Bernardino County, California